Luna Park Ride is the third live album released by the Finnish soprano Tarja Turunen as a solo artist. The concert was filmed at Stadium Luna Park in Buenos Aires, Argentina by the fans and mixed by Tim Palmer. Apart from this show the release also contains 70 minutes of bonus material filmed during 2010-2014.

Track listing

Charts performance

References

External links
 Luna Park Ride website
 Tarja Official on Facebook
 Tarja Turunen Official Website

2012 live albums
2012 video albums
Tarja Turunen albums
Edel AG albums
Live video albums
Albums recorded at Estadio Luna Park